Kuwahara is a Japanese surname. Notable Japanese people with the surname include: 

 Bob Kuwahara (1901-1964), Japanese-American animator for Walt Disney and Terrytoons
 Katsuyoshi Kuwahara (born 1944), football player, brother Takashi Kuwahara
 Kentaro Kuwahara (born 1985), baseball player
 Masayuki Kuwahara (born 1993), baseball player
 Mikine Kuwahara (1895–1991), government official
 Shun Kuwahara, gymnast
 Takashi Kuwahara (born 1948), football player and manager, brother of Katsuyoshi Kuwahara
 Takeshi Kuwahara (born 1985), football player
 Yasuo Kuwahara, composer and mandolinist
 Yasuyuki Kuwahara (1942–2017), football player
 , voice actress

Fictional characters
 Jackal Kuwahara, see List of The Prince of Tennis characters 

Japanese-language surnames